Park Farm is a housing scheme in the upper east area of Port Glasgow, Inverclyde, Scotland, built on the site of Park farm which stood near Parkhill Square. It consists of two distinct phases; the original phase stretches uphill from Parkhill Square to Mull Avenue and the second phase (Upper Park Farm) was built south of Mull Avenue in the late 1960s and consists of the streets around Oronsay Avenue. All of the streets take their names from Scottish islands. These include Stroma Avenue, Islay Avenue, Rona Avenue, Pladda Avenue, Westray Avenue, Sandray Avenue, Tiree Avenue, Staffa Avenue, Iona Road, Skye Road and Arran Avenue.

Neighbourhoods of Inverclyde
Housing estates in Scotland
Port Glasgow